

Events

Pre-1600
1027 – Robert II of France names his son Henry I as junior King of the Franks.
1097 – The Siege of Nicaea begins during the First Crusade.
1264 – Battle of Lewes: Henry III of England is captured and forced to sign the Mise of Lewes, making Simon de Montfort the effective ruler of England.
1509 – Battle of Agnadello: In northern Italy, French forces defeat the Republic of Venice.

1601–1900
1607 – English colonists establish "James Fort," which would become Jamestown, Virginia, the earliest permanent English settlement in the Americas.
1608 – The Protestant Union, a coalition of Protestant German states, is founded to defend the rights, land and safety of each member against the Catholic Church and Catholic German states.
1610 – Henry IV of France is assassinated by Catholic zealot François Ravaillac, and Louis XIII ascends the throne.
1643 – Four-year-old Louis XIV becomes King of France upon the death of his father, Louis XIII.
1747 – War of the Austrian Succession: A British fleet under Admiral George Anson defeats the French at the First Battle of Cape Finisterre.
1796 – Edward Jenner administers the first smallpox inoculation.
1800 – The 6th United States Congress recesses, and the process of moving the Federal government of the United States from Philadelphia to Washington, D.C., begins the following day.
1804 – William Clark and 42 men depart from Camp Dubois to join Meriwether Lewis at St Charles, Missouri, marking the beginning of the Lewis and Clark Expedition historic journey up the Missouri River.
1811 – Paraguay: Pedro Juan Caballero, Fulgencio Yegros and José Gaspar Rodríguez de Francia start actions to depose the Spanish governor.
1836 – The Treaties of Velasco are signed in Velasco, Texas.
1863 – American Civil War: The Battle of Jackson takes place.
1868 – Boshin War: The Battle of Utsunomiya Castle ends as former Tokugawa shogunate forces withdraw northward.
1870 – The first game of rugby in New Zealand is played in Nelson between Nelson College and the Nelson Rugby Football Club.
1878 – The last witchcraft trial held in the United States begins in Salem, Massachusetts, after Lucretia Brown, an adherent of Christian Science, accused Daniel Spofford of attempting to harm her through his mental powers.

1901–present
1900 – Opening of World Amateur championship at the Paris Exposition Universelle, also known as Olympic Games.  
1913 – Governor of New York William Sulzer approves the charter for the Rockefeller Foundation, which begins operations with a $100 million donation from John D. Rockefeller.
1915 – The May 14 Revolt takes place in Lisbon, Portugal.
1918 – Cape Town Mayor, Sir Harry Hands, inaugurates the Two-minute silence.
1931 – Five unarmed civilians are killed in the Ådalen shootings, as the Swedish military is called in to deal with protesting workers.
1935 – The Constitution of the Philippines is ratified by a popular vote.
1939 – Lina Medina becomes the youngest confirmed mother in medical history at the age of five.
1940 – World War II: Rotterdam, Netherlands is bombed by the Luftwaffe of Nazi Germany despite a ceasefire, killing about 900 people and destroying the historic city center.
1948 – Israel is declared to be an independent state and a provisional government is established. Immediately after the declaration, Israel is attacked by the neighboring Arab states, triggering the 1948 Arab–Israeli War.
1951 – Trains run on the Talyllyn Railway in Wales for the first time since preservation, making it the first railway in the world to be operated by volunteers.
1953 – Approximately 7,100 brewery workers in Milwaukee perform a walkout, marking the start of the 1953 Milwaukee brewery strike.
1955 – Cold War: Eight Communist bloc countries, including the Soviet Union, sign a mutual defense treaty called the Warsaw Pact.
1961 – Civil rights movement: A white mob twice attacks a Freedom Riders bus near Anniston, Alabama, before fire-bombing the bus and attacking the civil rights protesters who flee the burning vehicle.
1970 – Andreas Baader is freed from custody by Ulrike Meinhof, Gudrun Ensslin and others, a pivotal moment in the formation of the Red Army Faction.
1973 – Skylab, the United States' first space station, is launched.
1977 – A Dan-Air Boeing 707 leased to IAS Cargo Airlines crashes on approach to Lusaka International Airport in Lusaka, Zambia, killing six people.
1980 – Salvadoran Civil War: the Sumpul River massacre occurs in Chalatenango, El Salvador.
1987 – Fijian Prime Minister Timoci Bavadra is ousted from power in a coup d'état led by Lieutenant colonel Sitiveni Rabuka.
1988 – Carrollton bus collision: A drunk driver traveling the wrong way on Interstate 71 near Carrollton, Kentucky hits a converted school bus carrying a church youth group. Twenty-seven die in the crash and ensuing fire.
2004 – The Constitutional Court of South Korea overturns the impeachment of President Roh Moo-hyun.
  2004   – Rico Linhas Aéreas Flight 4815 crashes into the Amazon rainforest during approach to Eduardo Gomes International Airport in Manaus, Brazil, killing 33 people.
2008 – Battle of Piccadilly Gardens in Manchester city centre between Zenit supporters and Rangers supporters and the Greater Manchester Police, 39 policemen injured, one police-dog injured and 39 arrested.
2010 – Space Shuttle Atlantis launches on the STS-132 mission to deliver the first shuttle-launched Russian ISS component — Rassvet. This was originally slated to be the final launch of Atlantis, before Congress approved STS-135.
2012 – Agni Air Flight CHT crashes in Nepal after a failed go-around, killing 15 people.
2022 – Ten people are killed in a mass shooting in Buffalo, New York.

Births

Pre-1600

1316 – Charles IV, Holy Roman Emperor (d. 1378)
1553 – Margaret of Valois, Queen of France (d. 1615)
1574 – Francesco Rasi, Italian singer-songwriter, theorbo player, and poet (d. 1621)
1592 – Alice Barnham, wife of statesman Francis Bacon (d. 1650)

1601–1900
1630 – Katakura Kagenaga, Japanese samurai (d. 1681)
1652 – Johann Philipp Förtsch, German composer (d. 1732)
1657 – Sambhaji, Indian emperor (d. 1689)
1666 – Victor Amadeus II of Sardinia (d. 1732)
1679 – Peder Horrebow, Danish astronomer and mathematician (d. 1764)
1699 – Hans Joachim von Zieten, Prussian general (d. 1786)
1701 – William Emerson, English mathematician and academic (d. 1782)
1710 – Adolf Frederick, King of Sweden (d. 1771)
1725 – Ludovico Manin, the last Doge of Venice (d. 1802)
1727 – Thomas Gainsborough, English painter (d. 1788)
1737 – George Macartney, 1st Earl Macartney, Irish-English politician and diplomat, Governor of Grenada (d. 1806)
1752 – Timothy Dwight IV, American minister, theologian, and academic (d. 1817)
  1752   – Albrecht Thaer, German agronomist and author (d. 1828)
1761 – Samuel Dexter, American lawyer and politician, 4th United States Secretary of War, 3rd United States Secretary of the Treasury (d. 1816)
1771 – Robert Owen, Welsh businessman and social reformer (d. 1858)
  1771   – Thomas Wedgwood, English photographer (d. 1805)
1781 – Friedrich Ludwig Georg von Raumer, German historian and academic (d. 1873)
1794 – Fanny Imlay, daughter of British feminist Mary Wollstonecraft (d. 1816)
1814 – Charles Beyer, German-English engineer, co-founded Beyer, Peacock & Company (d. 1876)
1817 – Alexander Kaufmann, German poet and educator (d. 1893)
1820 – James Martin, Irish-Australian politician, 6th Premier of New South Wales (d. 1886)
1830 – Antonio Annetto Caruana, Maltese archaeologist and author (d. 1905)
1832 – Rudolf Lipschitz, German mathematician and academic (d. 1903)
1851 – Anna Laurens Dawes, American author and suffragist (d. 1938)
1852 – Henri Julien, Canadian illustrator (d. 1908)
1863 – John Charles Fields, Canadian mathematician, founder of the Fields Medal (d. 1932)
1867 – Kurt Eisner, German journalist and politician, Prime Minister of Bavaria (d. 1919)
1868 – Magnus Hirschfeld, German physician and sexologist (d. 1935)
1869 – Arthur Rostron, English captain (d. 1940)
1872 – Elia Dalla Costa, Italian cardinal (d. 1961)
1878 – J. L. Wilkinson, American baseball player and manager (d. 1964)
1879 – Fred Englehardt, American jumper (d. 1942)
1880 – Wilhelm List, German field marshal (d. 1971)
1881 – Lionel Hill, Australian politician, 30th Premier of South Australia (d. 1963)
  1881   – George Murray Hulbert, American judge and politician (d. 1950)
1885 – Otto Klemperer, German composer and conductor (d. 1973)
1887 – Ants Kurvits, Estonian general and politician, 10th Estonian Minister of War (d. 1943)
1888 – Archie Alexander, American mathematician and engineer (d. 1958)
1893 – Louis Verneuil, French actor and playwright (d. 1952)
1897 – Sidney Bechet, American saxophonist, clarinet player, and composer (d. 1959)
  1897   – Ed Ricketts, American biologist and ecologist (d. 1948)
1899 – Charlotte Auerbach, German-Scottish folklorist, geneticist, and zoologist (d. 1994)
  1899   – Pierre Victor Auger, French physicist and academic (d. 1993)
  1899   – Earle Combs, American baseball player and coach (d. 1976)
1900 – Hal Borland, American journalist and author (d. 1978)
  1900   – Walter Rehberg, Swiss pianist and composer (d. 1957)
  1900   – Cai Chang, Chinese first leader of All-China Women's Federation (d. 1990)
  1900   – Leo Smit, Dutch pianist and composer (d. 1943)
  1900   – Edgar Wind, German-English historian, author, and academic (d. 1971)

1901–present
1901 – Robert Ritter, German psychologist and physician (d. 1951)
1903 – Billie Dove, American actress (d. 1997)
1904 – Hans Albert Einstein, Swiss-American engineer and educator (d. 1973)
  1904   – Marcel Junod, Swiss physician and anesthesiologist (d. 1961)
1905 – Jean Daniélou, French cardinal and theologian (d. 1974)
  1905   – Herbert Morrison, American soldier and journalist (d. 1989)
  1905   – Antonio Berni, Argentinian painter, illustrator, and engraver (d. 1981)
1907 – Ayub Khan, Pakistani general and politician, 2nd President of Pakistan (d. 1974)
  1907   – Hans von der Groeben, German journalist and diplomat (d. 2005)
1908 – Betty Jeffrey, Australian nurse and author (d. 2000)
1909 – Godfrey Rampling, English sprinter and colonel (d. 2009)
1910 – Ken Viljoen, South African cricketer (d. 1974)
  1910   – Ne Win, Prime Minister and President of Burma (d. 2002)
1914 – Gul Khan Nasir, Pakistani journalist, poet, and politician (d. 1983)
  1914   – William Tutte, British codebreaker and mathematician (d. 2002) 
1916 – Robert F. Christy, Canadian-American physicist and astronomer (d. 2012)
  1916   – Lance Dossor, English-Australian pianist and educator (d. 2005)
  1916   – Marco Zanuso, Italian architect and designer (d. 2001)
1917 – Lou Harrison, American composer and critic (d. 2003)
  1917   – Norman Luboff, American composer and conductor (d. 1987)
1919 – Solange Chaput-Rolland, Canadian journalist and politician (d. 2001)
  1919   – John Hope, American soldier and meteorologist (d. 2002)
1921 – Richard Deacon, American actor (d. 1984)
1922 – Franjo Tuđman, Yugoslav historian; later 1st President of Croatia (d. 1999)
1923 – Adnan Pachachi, Iraqi politician, Iraqi Minister of Foreign Affairs (d. 2019)
  1923   – Mrinal Sen, Bangladeshi-Indian director, producer, and screenwriter (d. 2018)
1925 – Sophie Kurys, American baseball player (d. 2013)
  1925   – Patrice Munsel, American soprano and actress (d. 2016)
  1925   – Boris Parsadanian, Armenian-Estonian violinist and composer (d. 1997)
  1925   – Al Porcino, American trumpet player (d. 2013)
  1925   – Ninian Sanderson, Scottish race car driver (d. 1985)
1926 – Eric Morecambe, English comedian and actor (d. 1984)
1927 – Herbert W. Franke, Austrian scientist and author
1928 – Dub Jones, American R&B bass singer (d. 2000)
  1928   – Frederik H. Kreuger, Dutch engineer, author, and academic (d. 2015)
  1928   – Brian Macdonald, Canadian dancer and choreographer (d. 2014)
1929 – Barbara Branden, Canadian-American author (d. 2013)
  1929   – Henry McGee, English actor and singer (d. 2006)
  1929   – Gump Worsley, Canadian ice hockey player (d. 2007)
1930 – William James, Australian general and physician (d. 2015)
1931 – Alvin Lucier, American composer and academic (d. 2021)
1932 – Robert Bechtle, American lithographer and painter (d. 2020)
1933 – Siân Phillips, Welsh actress and singer
1935 – Ethel Johnson, American professional wrestler (d. 2018)
  1935   – Rudi Šeligo, Slovenian playwright and politician (d. 2004)
  1935   – Harvey Wollman, American politician, 26th Governor of South Dakota (d. 2022)
1936 – Bobby Darin, American singer-songwriter and actor (d. 1973)
  1936   – Dick Howser, American baseball player, coach, and manager (d. 1987)
1938 – Robert Boyd, English pediatrician and academic
1939 – Rupert Neudeck, German journalist and humanitarian (d. 2016)
  1939   – Troy Shondell, American singer-songwriter (d. 2016)
1940 – Chay Blyth, Scottish sailor and rower
  1940   – H. Jones, English colonel, Victoria Cross recipient (d. 1982)
  1940   – George Mathewson, Scottish banker and businessman
1941 – Ada den Haan, Dutch swimmer
1942 – Valeriy Brumel, Russian high jumper (d. 2003)
  1942   – Byron Dorgan, American lawyer and politician
  1942   – Alistair McAlpine, Baron McAlpine of West Green, English businessman and politician (d. 2014)
  1942   – Tony Pérez, Cuban-American baseball player and manager
  1942   – Malise Ruthven, Irish author and academic
1943 – Jack Bruce, Scottish-English singer-songwriter and bass player (d. 2014)
  1943   – L. Denis Desautels, Canadian accountant and civil servant
  1943   – Ólafur Ragnar Grímsson, Icelandic academic and politician, 5th President of Iceland
  1943   – Derek Leckenby, English pop-rock guitarist (d. 1994)
  1943   – Richard Peto, English statistician and epidemiologist
1944 – Gene Cornish, Canadian-American guitarist
  1944   – George Lucas, American director, producer, and screenwriter, founded Lucasfilm
  1944   – David Kelly, Welsh scientist (d. 2003)
1945 – Francesca Annis, English actress
  1945   – George Nicholls, English rugby player
  1945   – Yochanan Vollach, Israeli footballer
1946 – Sarah Hogg, Viscountess Hailsham, English economist and journalist
1947 – Al Ciner, American pop-rock guitarist
  1947   – Ana Martín, Mexican actress, singer, producer and former model (Miss Mexico 1963)
1948 – Timothy Stevenson, English lawyer and politician, Lord Lieutenant of Oxfordshire
  1948   – Bob Woolmer, Indian-English cricketer and coach (d. 2007)
1949 – Sverre Årnes, Norwegian author, screenwriter, and director
  1949   – Walter Day, American game designer and businessman, founded Twin Galaxies
  1949   – Johan Schans, Dutch swimmer
  1949   – Klaus-Peter Thaler, German cyclist
1951 – Jay Beckenstein, American saxophonist 
1952 – David Byrne, Scottish singer-songwriter, producer, and actor 
  1952   – Michael Fallon, Scottish politician, Secretary of State for Defence
  1952   – Orna Grumberg, Israeli computer scientist and academic
  1952   – Raul Mälk, Estonian politician, 22nd Estonian Minister of Foreign Affairs
  1952   – Wim Mertens, Belgian composer, countertenor vocalist, pianist, guitarist, and musicologist.
  1952   – Donald R. McMonagle, American colonel, pilot, and astronaut
  1952   – Robert Zemeckis, American director, producer, and screenwriter 
1953 – Tom Cochrane, Canadian singer-songwriter and guitarist 
  1953   – Hywel Williams, Welsh politician
1955 – Marie Chouinard, Canadian dancer and choreographer 
  1955   – Alasdair Fraser, Scottish fiddler 
  1955   – Peter Kirsten, South African cricketer and rugby player
  1955   – Dennis Martínez, Nicaraguan baseball player and coach
  1955   – Jens Sparschuh, German author and playwright
1956 – Hazel Blears, English lawyer and politician, Secretary of State for Communities and Local Government
  1956   – Steve Hogarth, English singer-songwriter and keyboardist 
1958 – Christine Brennan, American journalist and author
  1958   – Chris Evans, English-Australian politician, 26th Australian Minister for Employment
   1958  – Rudy Pérez, Cuban-born American composer and music producer 
  1958   – Wilma Rusman, Dutch runner 
1959 – Carlisle Best, Barbadian cricketer
  1959   – Patrick Bruel, French actor, singer, and poker player
  1959   – Markus Büchel, Liechtensteiner politician, 9th Prime Minister of Liechtenstein (d. 2013)
  1959   – Robert Greene, American author and translator
  1959   – John Holt, American football player (d. 2013)
  1959   – Rick Vaive, Canadian ice hockey player and coach
  1959   – Heather Wheeler, English politician
1960 – Anne Clark, English singer-songwriter and poet
  1960   – Alec Dankworth, English bassist and composer
  1960   – Frank Nobilo, New Zealand golfer
  1960   – Ronan Tynan, Irish tenor 
1961 – David Quantick, English journalist and critic
  1961   – Tommy Rogers, American wrestler (d. 2015)
  1961   – Tim Roth, English actor and director
  1961   – Alain Vigneault, Canadian ice hockey player and coach
1962 – Ian Astbury, English-Canadian singer-songwriter 
  1962   – C.C. DeVille, American guitarist, songwriter, and actor 
  1962   – Danny Huston, Italian-American actor and director
1963 – Pat Borders, American baseball player and coach
  1963   – David Yelland, English journalist and author
1964 – James M. Kelly, American colonel, pilot, and astronaut
  1964   – Suzy Kolber, American sportscaster and producer
  1964   – Alan McIndoe, Australian rugby league player
  1964   – Eric Peterson, American guitarist and songwriter
1965 – Eoin Colfer, Irish author 
1966 – Marianne Denicourt, French actress, director, and screenwriter
  1966   – Mike Inez, American rock bass player and songwriter
  1966   – Fab Morvan, French singer-songwriter, dancer and model
  1966   – Raphael Saadiq, American singer-songwriter, guitarist, and producer
1967 – Natasha Kaiser-Brown, American sprinter and coach
  1967   – Tony Siragusa, American football player and journalist (d. 2022)
1968 – Mary DePiero, Canadian diver
1969 – Stéphane Adam, French footballer
  1969   – Cate Blanchett, Australian actress
  1969   – Sabine Schmitz, German race car driver and sportscaster (d. 2021)
  1969   – Henry Smith, English politician
  1969   – Danny Wood, American singer-songwriter, record producer, and choreographer  
1971 – Deanne Bray, American actress
  1971   – Sofia Coppola, American director, producer, and screenwriter
  1971   – Martin Reim, Estonian footballer and manager
1972 – Kirstjen Nielsen, American attorney, 6th United States Secretary of Homeland Security
1973 – Natalie Appleton, Canadian singer and actress 
  1973   – Voshon Lenard, American basketball player
  1973   – Fraser Nelson, Scottish journalist
  1973   – Hakan Ünsal, Turkish footballer and sportscaster
  1973   – Julian White, English rugby player
  1974   – Anu Välba, Estonian journalist
1975 – Nicki Sørensen, Danish cyclist  
1976 – Hunter Burgan, American bass player 
  1976   – Brian Lawrence, American baseball player and coach
  1976   – Martine McCutcheon, English actress and singer
1977 – Sophie Anderton, English model and actress
  1977   – Roy Halladay, American baseball player (d. 2017)
  1977   – Ada Nicodemou, Cypriot-Australian actress 
1978 – Brent Harvey, Australian footballer 
  1978   – Eddie House, American basketball player
  1978   – André Macanga, Angolan footballer and manager
  1978   – Gustavo Varela, Uruguayan footballer
1979 – Dan Auerbach, American singer-songwriter, guitarist, and producer 
  1979   – Edwige Lawson-Wade, French basketball player
  1979   – Clinton Morrison, English-Irish footballer
  1979   – Carlos Tenorio, Ecuadorian footballer
1980 – Zdeněk Grygera, Czech footballer
  1980   – Pavel Londak, Estonian footballer
  1980   – Eugene Martineau, Dutch decathlete
  1980   – Júlia Sebestyén, Hungarian figure skater
  1980   – Hugo Southwell, English-Scottish rugby player
  1980   – Joe van Niekerk, South African rugby player
1981 – Pranav Mistry, Indian computer scientist, invented SixthSense
1983 – Anahí, Mexican singer-songwriter, producer, and actress 
  1983   – Keeley Donovan, English journalist
  1983   – Frank Gore, American football player
  1983   – Uroš Slokar, Slovenian basketball player
  1983   – Tatenda Taibu, Zimbabwean cricketer
  1983   – Amber Tamblyn, American actress, author, model, director
1984 – Gary Ablett, Jr., Australian footballer
  1984   – Luke Gregerson, American baseball player
  1984   – Olly Murs, English singer-songwriter
  1984   – Michael Rensing, German footballer
  1984   – Indrek Siska, Estonian footballer
  1984   – Mark Zuckerberg, American computer programmer and businessman, co-founded Facebook
1985 – Dustin Lynch, American singer-songwriter
  1985   – Sam Perrett, New Zealand rugby league player
  1985   – Simona Peycheva, Bulgarian gymnast
  1985   – Zack Ryder, American wrestler
1986 – Andrea Bovo, Italian footballer
  1986   – Clay Matthews III, American football player
  1986   – Marco Motta, Italian footballer
1987 – Jeong Min-hyeong, South Korean footballer (d. 2012)
  1987   – Franck Songo'o, Cameroonian footballer
  1987   – François Steyn, South African rugby player
1988 – Jayne Appel, American basketball player
1989 – Rob Gronkowski, American football player
  1989   – Alina Talay, Belorussian hurdler
1993 – Miranda Cosgrove, American actress and singer
  1993   – Kristina Mladenovic, French tennis player
  1993   – Bence Rakaczki, Hungarian footballer (d. 2014)
1994 – Marcos Aoás Corrêa, Brazilian footballer
  1994   – Pernille Blume, Danish swimmer
  1994   – Bronte Campbell, Australian swimmer
  1994   – Dennis Praet, Belgian footballer
1995 – Bernardo Fernandes da Silva Junior, Brazilian footballer
  1995   – Rose Lavelle, American soccer player
  1995   – Jonah Placid, Australian rugby player
1996 – Blake Brockington, American trans man and activist (d. 2015)
  1996   – Pokimane, Canadian online streamer
  1996   – Martin Garrix, Dutch DJ
  1996   – TheOdd1sOut, American YouTuber and animator
2001 – Jack Hughes, American hockey player

Deaths

Pre-1600
 649 – Pope Theodore I
 934 – Zhu Hongzhao, Chinese general and governor
 964 – Pope John XII (b. 927)
1080 – William Walcher, Bishop of Durham
1219 – William Marshal, 1st Earl of Pembroke, English soldier and politician (b. 1147)
1576 – Tahmasp I, Shah of Persia (b. 1514)

1601–1900
1603 – Magnus II, Duke of Saxe-Lauenburg (b. 1543)
1608 – Charles III, Duke of Lorraine (b. 1543)
1610 – Henry IV of France (b. 1553)
1643 – Louis XIII of France (b. 1601)
1649 – Friedrich Spanheim, Swiss theologian and academic (b. 1600)
1667 – Georges de Scudéry, French author, poet, and playwright (b. 1601)
1688 – Antoine Furetière, French scholar, lexicographer, and author (b. 1619)
1754 – Pierre-Claude Nivelle de La Chaussée, French playwright and producer (b. 1692)
1761 – Thomas Simpson, English mathematician and academic (b. 1710)
1847 – Fanny Mendelssohn, German pianist and composer (b. 1805)
1860 – Ludwig Bechstein, German author (b. 1801)
1873 – Gideon Brecher, Austrian physician and author (b. 1797)
1878 – Ōkubo Toshimichi, Japanese samurai and politician (b. 1830)
1881 – Mary Seacole, Jamaican-English nurse and author (b. 1805)
1889 – Volney Howard, American lawyer, jurist, and politician (b. 1809)
1893 – Ernst Kummer, German mathematician and academic (b. 1810)

1901–present
1906 – Carl Schurz, German-American general, journalist, and politician, 13th United States Secretary of the Interior (b. 1829)
1912 – Frederick VIII of Denmark (b. 1843)
  1912   – August Strindberg, Swedish playwright, novelist, poet, essayist (b. 1849)
1918 – James Gordon Bennett, Jr., American journalist and publisher (b. 1841)
1919 – Henry J. Heinz, American businessman, founded the H. J. Heinz Company (b. 1844)
1923 – N. G. Chandavarkar, Indian jurist and politician (b. 1855)
  1923   – Charles de Freycinet, French engineer and politician, 43rd Prime Minister of France (b. 1828)
1931 – David Belasco, American director, producer, and playwright (b. 1853)
1934 – Lou Criger, American baseball player and manager (b. 1872)
1935 – Magnus Hirschfeld, German physician and sexologist (b. 1868)
1936 – Edmund Allenby, 1st Viscount Allenby, English field marshal and diplomat, British High Commissioner in Egypt (b. 1861)
1940 – Emma Goldman, Lithuanian author and activist (b. 1869)
  1940   – Menno ter Braak, Dutch author (b. 1902)
1943 – Henri La Fontaine, Belgian lawyer and author, Nobel Prize laureate (b. 1854)
1945 – Heber J. Grant, American religious leader, 7th President of The Church of Jesus Christ of Latter-day Saints (b. 1856)
  1945   – Wolfgang Lüth, Latvian-German captain (b. 1913)
  1945   – Isis Pogson, English astronomer and meteorologist (b. 1852)
1953 – Yasuo Kuniyoshi, American painter and photographer (b. 1893)
1954 – Heinz Guderian, Prussian-German general (b. 1888)
1956 – Joan Malleson, English physician (b. 1889)
1957 – Marie Vassilieff, Russian-French painter (b. 1884)
1959 – Sidney Bechet, American saxophonist, clarinet player, and composer (b. 1897)
  1959   – Infanta Maria Antonia of Portugal (b. 1862)
1960 – Lucrezia Bori, Spanish soprano and actress (b. 1887)
1962 – Florence Auer, American actress and screenwriter (b. 1880)
1968 – Husband E. Kimmel, American admiral (b. 1882)
1969 – Enid Bennett, Australian-American actress (b. 1893)
  1969   – Frederick Lane, Australian swimmer (b. 1888)
1970 – Billie Burke, American actress and singer (b. 1884)
1972 – Ike Moriz, German-South African singer-songwriter, producer and actor 
1973 – Jean Gebser, German linguist, philosopher, and poet (b. 1905)
1976 – Keith Relf, English singer-songwriter, harmonica player, and producer (b. 1943)
1979 – Jean Rhys, Dominican-English novelist (b. 1890)
1980 – Hugh Griffith, Welsh actor (b. 1912)
1982 – Hugh Beaumont, American actor (b. 1909)
1983 – Roger J. Traynor, American academic and jurist, 23rd Chief Justice of California (b. 1900)
  1983   – Miguel Alemán Valdés, Mexican politician, 46th President of Mexico (b. 1900)
1984 – Ted Hicks, Australian public servant and diplomat, Australian High Commissioner to New Zealand (b. 1910)
  1984   – Walter Rauff, German SS officer (b. 1906)
1987 – Rita Hayworth, American actress and dancer (b. 1918)
  1987   – Vitomil Zupan, Slovenian poet and playwright (b. 1914)
1988 – Willem Drees, Dutch politician and historian, Prime Minister of the Netherlands (1948–1958) (b. 1886)
1991 – Aladár Gerevich, Hungarian fencer (b. 1910)
1992 – Nie Rongzhen, Chinese general and politician, Mayor of Beijing (b. 1899)
1993 – William Randolph Hearst, Jr., American journalist and publisher (b. 1908)
1994 – Cihat Arman, Turkish footballer and manager (b. 1915)
  1994   – W. Graham Claytor Jr., American businessman, lieutenant, and politician, 15th United States Secretary of the Navy (b. 1914)
1995 – Christian B. Anfinsen, American biochemist and academic, Nobel Prize laureate (b. 1916)
1997 – Harry Blackstone Jr., American magician and author (b. 1934)
  1997   – Boris Parsadanian, Armenian-Estonian violinist and composer (b. 1925)
1998 – Marjory Stoneman Douglas, American journalist and environmentalist (b. 1890)
  1998   – Frank Sinatra, American singer and actor (b. 1915)
2000 – Keizō Obuchi, Japanese politician, 84th Prime Minister of Japan (b. 1937)
2001 – Paul Bénichou, French writer, intellectual, critic, and literary historian (b. 1908)
  2001   – Gil Langley, Australian cricketer, footballer, and politician (b. 1919)
2003 – Dave DeBusschere, American basketball player and coach (b. 1940)
  2003   – Wendy Hiller, English actress (b. 1912)
  2003   – Robert Stack, American actor and producer (b. 1919)
2004 – Anna Lee, English-American actress (b. 1913) 
  2005   – Jimmy Martin, American musician (b. 1927)
2006 – Lew Anderson, American actor and saxophonist (b. 1922)
  2006   – Stanley Kunitz, American poet and translator (b. 1905)
  2006   – Eva Norvind, Mexican actress, director, and producer (b. 1944)
2007 – Mary Scheier, American sculptor and educator (b. 1908)
  2007   – Ülo Jõgi, Estonian historian and author (b. 1921)
2010 – Frank J. Dodd, American businessman and politician, president of the New Jersey Senate (b. 1938)
  2010   – Norman Hand, American football player (b. 1972)
  2010   – Goh Keng Swee, Singaporean soldier and politician, 2nd Deputy Prime Minister of Singapore (b. 1918)
2012 – Ernst Hinterberger, Austrian author and screenwriter (b. 1931)
  2012   – Mario Trejo, Argentinian poet, playwright, and journalist (b. 1926)
2013 – Wayne Brown, American accountant and politician, 14th Mayor of Mesa (b. 1936)
  2013   – Arsen Chilingaryan, Armenian footballer and manager (b. 1962)
  2013   – Asghar Ali Engineer, Indian author and activist (b. 1939)
  2013   – Ray Guy, Canadian journalist (b. 1939)
2014 – Jeffrey Kruger, English-American businessman (b. 1931)
  2014   – Emanuel Raymond Lewis, American librarian and author (b. 1928)
  2014   – Morvin Simon, New Zealand historian, composer, and conductor (b. 1944)
2015 – B.B. King, American singer-songwriter, guitarist, and producer (b. 1925)
  2015   – Micheál O'Brien, Irish footballer and hurler (b. 1923)
  2015   – Stanton J. Peale, American astrophysicist and academic (b. 1937)
  2015   – Franz Wright, Austrian-American poet and translator (b. 1953)
2016 – Darwyn Cooke, American comic book writer and artist (b. 1962)
2017 – Powers Boothe, American actor (b. 1948)
2018 – Tom Wolfe, American author (b. 1931)
2019 – Tim Conway, American actor, writer, and comedian (b. 1933)
  2019   – Grumpy Cat, American cat and internet meme celebrity (b. 2012)

Holidays and observances
 Christian feast day:
 Boniface of Tarsus
 Engelmund of Velsen
 Matthias the Apostle (Roman Catholic Church, Anglican Communion)
 Michael Garicoïts 
 Mo Chutu of Lismore (Roman Catholic Church)
 Victor and Corona 
 May 14 (Eastern Orthodox liturgics)
 Earliest day on which the first day of Sanja Matsuri can fall, while May 21 is the latest; celebrated on the third weekend of May. (Sensō-ji, Tokyo)
 Flag Day (Paraguay)
 Hastings Banda's Birthday (Malawi)
 National Unification Day (Liberia)
 The first day of Izumo-taisha Shrine Grand Festival. (Izumo-taisha)

References

External links

 BBC: On This Day
 
 Historical Events on May 14

Days of the year
May